Noše is a small settlement near Brezje in the Municipality of Radovljica in the Upper Carniola region of Slovenia.

References

External links

Noše at Geopedia

Populated places in the Municipality of Radovljica